Idan or Edan may refers to:

People

Given name
Edan (musician),  American alternative hip hop artist
Edan Everly, American guitarist, musician, singer songwriter
Edan Gross, American child actor
Edan Milton Hughes, American art dealer and art collector 
Edan Leshem, Israeli tennis player
Edan Lui, Hong Kong singer
Idan Alterman, Israeli television, film, and theater actor
Idan Baruch, Israeli-Romanian football goalkeeper 
Idan David, Israeli footballer
Idan Maimon, Israeli handball player
Idan Malichi, Israeli footballer 
Idan Raichel, Israeli singer-songwriter and musician
Idan Roll, an Israeli politician
Idan Rubin, Israeli footballer 
Idan Sade, Israeli footballer
Idan Schefler, Israeli footballer 
Idan Shriki, Israeli footballer
Idan Shum, Israeli footballer
Idan Srur, Israeli footballer 
Idan Tal (born 1975), Israeli footballer 
Idan Vered, Israeli footballer 
Idan Weitzman, Israeli footballer
Idan Yaniv, Israeli singer
 Idan Zalmanson (born 1995), Israeli basketball player
 Máedóc of Ferns, also referred to as Saint Edan

Surname

Abdullah Al-Edan, Qatar football defender
John Idan, American guitarist and vocalist
Sarah Idan, an Iraqi woman was a Miss Universe contestant and the target of people's death threats after she took pictures with Israeli contestants.

Music
 The Idan Raichel Project, self-titled debut album by Idan Raichel.

Places
 
Edan Hills, South Australia, Australian suburb of the city of Mitcham
Idan, Israel, a moshav in the Arava region of southern Israel. 
Idan HaNegev Industrial Park, industrial park southeast of Rahat, Israel 
St Edan's Cathedral, Irish cathedral